Nick Kuipers may refer to:

 Nick Kuipers (footballer, born 1988), Dutch footballer for IJsselmeervogels
 Nick Kuipers (footballer, born 1992), Dutch footballer for MVV Maastricht